The 2003 New Zealand rugby league season was the 96th season of rugby league that had been played in New Zealand. The main feature of the year was the fourth season of the Bartercard Cup competition that was run by the New Zealand Rugby League. The Canterbury Bulls won the Cup by defeating the Marist Richmond Brothers 32–28 in the Grand Final.

International competitions 

The New Zealand national rugby league team played Australia home and away, losing in Australia before defeating them 30–16 at North Harbour Stadium. Coached by Daniel Anderson, New Zealand included; David Vaealiki, Matt Utai, Nigel Vagana, Clinton Toopi, Francis Meli, Willie Talau, Stacey Jones, Paul Rauhihi, Richard Swain, captain Ruben Wiki, Stephen Kearney, Logan Swann, Awen Guttenbeil, Monty Betham, Jerry Seuseu, Tony Puletua, Joe Galuvao, Vinnie Anderson, Sione Faumuina, Motu Tony, Nathan and Jason Cayless, Thomas Leuluai, Ali Lauiti'iti and Henry Fa'afili.

A New Zealand 'A' side toured Great Britain. The team played in five matches with their best result being a draw. They drew with Cumbria 24-all and lost to National League Two 27–8, Warrington 28–26, National League One 40-28 and the full Great Britain side 52–18. The team was coached by Gerard Stokes and included Shane Beyers, Paul Fisiiahi, Steve Buckingham, Aoterangi Herangi, Tyrone Pau, George Tuakura, Lusi Sione, Jesse Royal, Tame Tupou, Wayne McDade, Epalahame Lauaki and Ben Lythe.

The New Zealand Māori team toured France. The team included Phillip Shead whose brother, Artie, played against him for France. Former New Zealander Vincent Wulf also played for France. Coached by Bernie Perenara, the Māori side also included Herewini Rangi, Jeremy Smith and Aaron Heremaia, who captained the side.

Ruben Wiki was named the New Zealand Rugby League player of the year. Thomas Leuluai was the Rookie of the Year.

National competitions

Rugby League Cup

Bartercard Cup 
The 2003 Bartercard Cup was the fourth season of the Bartercard Cup competition run by the New Zealand Rugby League. There were no major team changes however the North Harbour Tigers replaced the Northcote Tigers as they now represented all of the North Shore clubs. The Canterbury Bulls finished as minor premiers and were the only non-Auckland team to make the finals.

The Teams 
 Hibiscus Coast were coached by Tony Benson and included Odell Manuel, Tyrone Pau and Aaron Heremaia.
 The North Harbour side included Mark Robinson.
 Glenora included Epalahame Lauaki.
 Marist Richmond were coached by Bernie Perenara and included Ricky Henry, Karl Guttenbeil, Tangi Ropati, Evarn Tuimavave, Tevita Latu, Jerome Ropati, Marcus Perenara, Steve Matai and Motu Tony.
 Mt Albert included Steve Buckingham, Wayne McDade and Meti Noovao. John Ackland finished the season as coach after originally leaving the club to coach the Villeneuve Leopards.
 Otahuhu included Boycie Nelson and George Tuakura.
 The Eastern Tornadoes included Paul Fisi'iahi, Herewini Rangi, Zebastian Lucky Luisi and Tame Tupou.
 Manurewa were coached by Kelly Shelford.
 Taranaki were coached by Alan Jackson.
 Central were coached by Peter Sixtus and included Jesse Royal and Sonny Whakarau.
 Wellington were coached by Gerard Stokes and included John Tamanika.
 Canterbury were coached by Phil Prescott and included Kane Ferris, Richard Villasanti, Charlie Herekotukutuku, Lusi Sione, Vince Whare, Shane Beyers and Corey Lawrie.

Season standings 

*Wellington were docked three points for registration infringements.

The Playoffs

Grand Final 
The Grand Final was held at Ericsson Stadium with the Fox Memorial Grand Final as a curtain raiser.

Awards 
 Player of the Year: Shane Beyers
 Coach of the Year: Phil Prescott
 Personality of the Year: Gary Endacott

North Island Championship Provincial Competition 
Four teams competed in the North Island Championship Provincial Competition; Northland, Waikato, Bay of Plenty and the Coastline Mariners.

Australian competitions 

The New Zealand Warriors competed in the National Rugby League competition. They finished 6th out of 15 teams and won two games before losing the Preliminary Final to eventual premiers the Penrith Panthers.

Club competitions

Auckland 

The Mangere East Hawks won both the Fox Memorial trophy and the Rukutai Shield (minor premiership). They defeated the Hibiscus Coast Raiders 30–29 in the Grand Final. The Raiders had earlier won the preseason Roope Rooster trophy.

The Northcote Tigers won the Sharman Cup (Division Two) while East Coast Bays won the Phelan Shield (Division Three).

Wellington 
Petone and the Wainuiomata Lions contested the Wellington Rugby League Grand Final. It was played at Maidstone Park on 13 September. Marvin Karawana played in the final for the Lions.

Canterbury 
Halswell won the Canterbury Rugby League title.

Riccarton hosted Runanga in the annual Thacker Shield challenge.

Other Competitions 
Turangawaewae defeated Taniwharau in the Waicoa Bay championship.

The Marist Dragons and Waitara Bears met in the Taranaki Rugby League grand final.

References